The Football Federation of Tasmania organises several annual Tasmanian association football (soccer) cups and tournaments alongside the regular league competitions that they also run. The first cup competition in Tasmania was the Falkinder Cup, which began in 1913. For nearly 60 years it was the state's premier football cup tournament, but was eclipsed by the Statewide Cup, and the pre-season Summer Cup. Various Cups and trophies have come and gone, and currently the main non-league tournaments in Tasmania are the Statewide Cup (currently known as the Milan Lakoseljac Cup), and the three pre-season tournaments, the Summer Cup (south), the North West Summer Cup (North West), and the Steve Hudson Cup.

Milan Lakoseljac Cup

The male Statewide knock-out cup – run annually with clubs from Northern and Southern Leagues – is named the Milan Lakoseljac Cup – also known as the Statewide Cup – and which was previously known as the Ampol Cup for sponsorship reasons between 1964 and 1976. The competition is a knockout cup competition with match ups played over one leg.  The competition consists of initial qualification rounds involving the teams from the lower divisions, with teams from higher divisions entering in later rounds.  Clubs from all leagues within the Tasmanian league system are eligible to enter, although each club can only enter one team.  Clubs are not separated geographically.  Clubs are matched up based on the random draw involving clubs from all over the state.

Although they ran concurrently from 1963 to 1970 the Ampol Cup eclipsed its historical southern rival, the Falkinder Cup, and replaced it entirely in 1970 as Tasmania's premier knockout cup football competition.

Since 2014, this knockout competition has been the qualification route for the single Tasmanian federation representative for the FFA Cup, now known as the Australia Cup.

List of Milan Lakoseljac Cup winners

Overall honours

Pre-season cups
Three regional cup competitions are played each year in the pre-season prior to the regular league season commencing.

Summer Cup (Southern)

The Summer Cup is a pre-season knock-out tournament mainly for the southern clubs.

References :

Summer Cup (North West) 

References :

Steve Hudson Cup
This Cup is named for Stephen Geoffrey Hudson, who died on 26 November 1979 as a result of injury suffered whilst playing for the Launceston United Soccer Club. In past years entries were received from both North and North West soccer Clubs; however in latter years entries have mainly been only from Launceston-based clubs, with the occasional Southern team participating.

	

References :

Former competitions

Falkinder Cup

The Falkinder Cup was the South's premier football cup competition from 1913 until 1970. This tournament was eclipsed by the Statewide Cup, and in the early 1970s was incorporated into the pre-season Summer Cup, and was abandoned after running for 70 years.

Association Cup

The Association Cup was another knockout Cup for southern football teams, commencing in 1960. Similar to the Falkinder Cup, in the early 1970s was incorporated into the pre-season Summer Cup.

Lloyd Triestino Cup

The Lloyd Triestino Cup was an end of season tournament, initially sponsored by the eponymous Italian shipping company, and from 1976 onwards known as the DJ Trophy.

Cadbury Trophy

Notes

References

External links
 Football Federation Tasmania – official website
 SoccerAust – stats for past seasons

Soccer in Tasmania
Soccer cup competitions in Australia